Southeast Valley High School is a high school in Gowrie, Iowa, operated by the Prairie Valley Community School District, in association with the Southeast Webster-Grand Community School District, as "Southeast Valley Schools".

The high school serves residents of both districts. Prairie Valley includes Gowrie, Callender, Farnhamville, Moorland, Rinard, and Somers. while SWG, based in Burnside, also serves Boxholm, Dayton, Fraser, Harcourt, Lehigh, and Pilot Mound.

History
Previously Prairie Valley High School in Gowrie was the high school of the Prairie Valley district.

In August 2014, the Prairie Valley district began a whole grade-sharing arrangement with the Southeast Webster-Grand district as a way to deal with smaller enrollments and as a way to save money. The two districts together share middle and high schools.

By 2019, the school received new renovations, including a new main entrance with extra security features. Visitors are required to pass through the administrative offices before being able to access the rest of the building.

Athletics 
The Jaguars compete in the Twin Lakes Conference in the following sports:

Cross Country 
Volleyball 
Football 
Basketball
Wrestling 
Track and Field
Golf 
Baseball 
Softball

See also
List of high schools in Iowa

References

External links
 Southeast Valley High School
 Southeast Valley grade-sharing agreement

Public high schools in Iowa
Schools in Webster County, Iowa
2014 establishments in Iowa